Stefan Emmerling (born 10 February 1966) is a German football manager and former player who manages Kickers Emden.

References

External links
 
 

1966 births
Living people
People from Rhein-Neckar-Kreis
Sportspeople from Karlsruhe (region)
Footballers from Baden-Württemberg
German footballers
Association football defenders
German football managers
SV Sandhausen players
1. FC Kaiserslautern players
SG Wattenscheid 09 players
Hannover 96 players
MSV Duisburg players
Fortuna Düsseldorf players
Bundesliga players
2. Bundesliga players
Fortuna Düsseldorf managers
Kickers Emden managers
Rot Weiss Ahlen managers
FC Rot-Weiß Erfurt managers
2. Bundesliga managers
SC Paderborn 07 managers
3. Liga managers